Waheed Khamis Al-Salem (born 1960) is a Qatari sprinter. He competed in the men's 4 × 100 metres relay at the 1984 Summer Olympics.

References

1960 births
Living people
Athletes (track and field) at the 1984 Summer Olympics
Qatari male sprinters
Olympic athletes of Qatar
Place of birth missing (living people)